The 2003 Big 12 men's basketball tournament was played at the American Airlines Center in Dallas, Texas, making it the first time the tournament was ever played outside Kansas City.

Seeding
The Tournament consisted of a 12 team single-elimination tournament with the top 4 seeds receiving a bye.

Schedule

Bracket

* Indicates overtime game

All-Tournament Team
Most Outstanding Player – Hollis Price, Oklahoma

See also
2003 Big 12 Conference women's basketball tournament
2003 NCAA Division I men's basketball tournament
2002–03 NCAA Division I men's basketball rankings

References

Big 12 men's basketball tournament
Tournament
Big 12 men's basketball tournament
Big 12 men's basketball tournament
Basketball in the Dallas–Fort Worth metroplex